Giovanni Battista Bassani (c. 1650 – 1 October 1716) was an Italian composer, violinist, and organist.

Biography
Bassani was born in Padua.  It is thought that he studied in Venice under Daniele Castrovillari and in Ferrara under Giovanni Legrenzi. Charles Burney and John Hawkins claimed he taught Arcangelo Corelli, but there is no solid evidence for this assertion. He was an organist at the Accademia della Morte in Ferrara from 1667, but had probably left by 1675. He published his first music in 1677; the title page calls him maestro of music at the Confraternità della Morte in Finale Emilia, not far from Modena. He was maestro di cappella at Duke Alessandro II della Mirandola's court in 1680, and was elected principe at the Accademica Filarmonica in Bologna. He became maestro di cappella at the Accademia della Morte in Ferrara in 1683, and then maestro di cappella at Ferrara Cathedral in 1686. For his contributions to the musical life of Ferrara, he was often called "Bassani of Ferrara". He wrote 76 liturgically ordered services for use at Ferrara Cathedral between 1710 and 1712. He became director of music at Santa Maria Maggiore in Bergamo in 1712, and also taught at the Congregazione di Carità in the same city until his death.

Bassani was a celebrated violinist in his own time, and his fame was compounded by Burney's praise for him. His trio sonatas are his best-known and most often performed pieces in modern times. He wrote 13 oratorios, but only four survive, and all 13 of his operas have been lost aside from a few arias from Gli amori alla moda.

Works
Operas
 L'amorosa preda di Paride, 1683 
 Falarido, tiranno d'Agrigento, 1685 
 L'Alarico, re de'Goti, 1685 
 Vitige, re de'Vandalia, 1686 
 Agrippina in Baia, 1687 
 Gli amori alla moda, 1688, 10 arias survive
 Il trionfo di Venere in Ida, 1688 
 La Ginevra, infanta di Scozia, 1690 
 Le vicende di cocceio Nerva, 1691 
 Gli amori tra gl'odii, o sia Il Ramiro in Norvegia, 1693 
 Roderico, 1696 
 Armida al campo, 1711

Oratorios
 L'Esaltazione di S Croce, 1675 
 L'Epulone, 1675 
 La tromba della divina misericordia, 1676
 L'amore ingeniero, 1678 
 Il mistico Roveto, 1681 
 La morte delusa, 1686
 Il Davide punito overo La pestilente strage d'Israele, 1686; performed as Nella luna eclissata dal Cristiano valore, 1687, and as La Pietà trionfante della morte, 1692 and 1697 
 Il Giona, 1689
 Mosè risorto dalle acque, 1694
 Il conte di Bacheville, 1696 
 Susanna, 1697 
 Gl'impegni del divino amore nel transito della Beata Caterina Vegri detta di Bologna, 1703 
 Il trionfo della Fede, 1704

Other vocal works
 8 masses
 at least 20 motets
 various sacred solo vocal works and choral works
 76 services, most with four solo voices, chorus, and basso continuo

Instrumental music
 16 trio sonatas
 12 sinfonie da chiesa, op. 5, 1683

References
Smith/Vanscheeuwijck, "Giovanni Battista Bassani". The New Grove Dictionary of Music and Musicians online.

External links

Year of birth uncertain
1716 deaths
18th-century keyboardists
18th-century Italian male musicians
18th-century Italian composers
Italian Baroque composers
Italian male classical composers
Italian classical violinists
Male classical violinists
Italian classical organists
Male classical organists
Musicians from Padua